Microbacterium pumilum is a Gram-positive and non-motile bacterium from the genus Microbacterium which has been isolated from soil from Japan.

References

Further reading

External links
Type strain of Microbacterium pumilum at BacDive -  the Bacterial Diversity Metadatabase	

Bacteria described in 2006
pumilum